Johanna Elisabeth von Nassau-Hadamar (17 January 1619, in Dillenburg – 2 March 1647, in Harzgerode) was a princess of Nassau-Hadamar by birth, and by marriage a princess of Anhalt-Harzgerode.

Life 
Her father was Prince John Louis of Nassau-Hadamar, her mother was Ursula of Lippe-Detmold, a daughter of Count Simon VI of Lippe.

Marriage and issue 
She married Prince Frederick of Anhalt-Harzgerode on 10 August 1642 in Bückeburg.  She was his first wife.  They had the following children:
 William Louis (1643-1709), Prince of Anhalt-Harzgerode, married
 in 1671 to Countess Elizabeth Albertine of Solms-Laubach (1631-1693)
 in 1695 to Princess Sophie Auguste of Nassau-Dillenburg (1666-1733)
 Anna Ursula (1645-1647)
 Elizabeth Charlotte (1647-1723), married
 in 1663 to Prince William Louis of Anhalt-Köthen (1638-1665)
 in 1666 Duke Augustus of Schleswig-Holstein-Sonderburg-Plön-Norburg (1635-1699)

House of Nassau
1619 births
17th-century German people
1647 deaths
Daughters of monarchs
Deaths in childbirth